Leighton Marissa Meester (born April 9, 1986) is an American actress, singer, and model. She is best known for her starring role as the devious socialite Blair Waldorf on Gossip Girl on The CW (2007–2012). She has also appeared in films such as Killer Movie (2008), Country Strong (2010), The Roommate (2011), Monte Carlo (2011), The Oranges (2011), The Judge (2014) and The Weekend Away (2022). She portrayed Angie D'Amato on the ABC sitcom Single Parents (2018–2020). Meester made her Broadway debut in Of Mice and Men (2014).

In addition to acting, Meester has ventured into music. In 2009, she was featured on the Cobra Starship single "Good Girls Go Bad", which charted in the top ten on the Billboard Hot 100. She released solo singles "Somebody to Love" (2009) and "Your Love's a Drug" (2010) on the Universal Republic label. Meester has also recorded songs for various soundtracks. Her debut album, Heartstrings, was independently released in 2014. She has also modeled, having been the face of the Jimmy Choo, Herbal Essences, and Vera Wang brands.

Early life
Meester was born in Fort Worth, Texas, to Douglas Jay Meester and Constance Lynn (née Haas). Her father is a real estate broker; her mother is a writer. She has two brothers: an older brother, Douglas Logan Meester (born 1983), and a younger brother, Alexander "Lex" Meester (born 1994). At the time of her birth, Meester's parents were serving time in a federal prison for their involvement in a drug ring that smuggled marijuana from Jamaica to the United States. Constance was able to give birth to Leighton in a hospital and nurse her for three months in a halfway house, before returning to prison to complete her sentence. Her paternal grandparents cared for Meester during this period. She has maintained that her parents gave her a normal upbringing and, despite their criminal past, has stated, "It made me realize that you can't judge anyone—especially your parents—for what they've done in their past, because people change." She grew up in Marco Island, Florida, where she participated in productions at a local playhouse. Her parents separated in 1992.

When she was 11 years old, Meester and her siblings moved with their mother to New York City. She attended the Professional Children's School and began working as a model with Wilhelmina, booking a Ralph Lauren campaign shot by Bruce Weber, and working with then-photographer Sofia Coppola. Meester also booked commercials for Tamagotchi and Clearasil, and modeled for Limited Too alongside Amanda Seyfried. At age 14, she relocated to Los Angeles and attended Hollywood and Beverly Hills High Schools. Meester then transferred to a small private school and graduated a year earlier than usual.

Career

1999–2007: Career beginnings
Meester made her acting debut in 1999 as a murder victim's friend, Alyssa Turner, on an episode of Law & Order. Following this, she made her film debut in Hangman's Curse (2003), based on the bestselling book by Frank Peretti. She had a series regular role in Tarzan, which aired for only eight episodes. A recurring role in Entourage as Justine Chapin and Veronica Mars as Carrie Bishop followed in 2004 and 2005. Meester booked guest roles in the series Crossing Jordan, 8 Simple Rules, 7th Heaven and 24. She was cast as series regular in Surface as Savannah Barnett.

In 2006, Meester appeared in two films, Flourish and Inside. She also guest starred in an episode of Numbers and appeared in two episodes of House as Ali Johnson, a teenager who has a crush on Gregory House. She then had guest roles on CSI: Miami and Shark, and portrayed the female lead in the horror film Drive-Thru, for which she recorded the song "Inside the Black". Meester was cast as identical twin sisters Kayla and Kelly Rhodes in the ABC crime-drama series Secrets of a Small Town, but the network decided not to forward the series.

2007–2012: Gossip Girl and music ventures

In 2007, Meester was cast in The CW's teen drama series Gossip Girl as Blair Waldorf, based on the book series of the same name by Cecily von Ziegesar. She first auditioned for the role of Serena van der Woodsen, but told the producers that she could better play Blair. However, it was important that Serena was blonde and Blair was brunette, so Meester dyed her hair brown for the role. Her performance was the most critically acclaimed of the show, with Blair being cited as the series' breakout character. She also garnered media attention for her wardrobe on the show. The series ended after six seasons and 120 episodes. Meester later starred in the television film The Haunting of Sorority Row, and had a role in the ensemble comedy-drama film Remember the Daze. In 2008, she appeared in the horror-thriller film Killer Movie and reprised her role in Entourage singing with Tony Bennett in the episode.

Early in 2009, Meester partnered with Reebok to model their new Top Down sneakers. Apart from Gossip Girl, Meester worked with co-star Ed Westwick in a Nikon Coolpix series camera advertisement, and both were the faces of the Korean clothing line ASK Enquired. In April 2009, she released the song "Birthday" featuring duo Awesome New Republic. A version without her vocals was included on their Rational Geographic Vol. I album. Later that month, Meester signed a recording contract with Universal Republic. Meester provided vocals on Cobra Starship's song "Good Girls Go Bad", which peaked at number seven on the Billboard Hot 100. In July, "Body Control" surfaced on the internet. Meester's first official single, "Somebody to Love", featuring R&B singer Robin Thicke, was released for airplay on October 13, 2009, and became available for digital download the following day. She recorded a cover of the song "Christmas (Baby Please Come Home)" for the compilation album A Very Special Christmas 7.

Her second single, "Your Love's a Drug", was digitally released on March 30, 2010, and she is also featured on Stephen Jerzak's song "She Said". Meester did a duet with DJ Clinton Sparks on "Front Cut", which appeared on the internet in February 2011. Lil Wayne worked with her on an unreleased song titled "Make It Rain" and Jesse McCartney wrote another song. The album was produced by Polow Da Don, Harvey Mason Jr., and Spencer Nezey. Meester began working on it in March 2009 and the album was initially projected to be released in the fall of 2009, but was later delayed to early 2010. It was pushed back again to late 2010, and was ultimately shelved.

Meester had small roles in the comedies Date Night and Going the Distance. She then starred with Gwyneth Paltrow and Garrett Hedlund in the country music drama Country Strong. Wesley Morris of The Boston Globe described Meester as the best part of the film, writing, "She's just doing Reese Witherspoon's June Carter Cash in Walk the Line with dabs of Miley Cyrus and Kellie Pickler. But it's not an impersonation; it's a performance with its own comedy and sweetness." Claudia Puig of USA Today was also positive, stating "Meester shows she can do more than play one of Gossip Girl privileged Manhattan socialites." For the film, Meester recorded a cover of the song "Words I Couldn't Say" by Rascal Flatts as well as "A Little Bit Stronger" by Sara Evans featured on the film's soundtrack; a promotional single titled "Summer Girl"; and a duet with Garrett Hedlund titled "Give In To Me". After wrapping, she received a guitar from Tim McGraw and decided to learn how to play it. In October 2010, Meester said she had been working with a band called Check in the Dark and had been writing for the last six months after being inspired by Country Strong. She revealed her influences, "I love Neil Young and Joni Mitchell, that style of music, and as far as songwriting I think that's where my heart is."

In 2010, Meester signed on to be the spokesperson for Herbal Essences hair products. In the same year, she took part in Bulgari's humanitarian efforts for the Save the Children organization with Isabella Rossellini and Maribel Verdú. She next fronted a beauty campaign for Korean brand eSpoir. Vera Wang selected her to be the face of the fragrance Lovestruck in 2011, stating that Meester's "beauty, talent and spirit will inspire all the young women that I hope will enjoy this passionate, new young fragrance." The next year, Meester shot a campaign for the follow-up fragrance, Lovestruck Floral Rush. Italian fashion house Missoni named Meester the face of their spring/summer 2011 campaign.

Meester next starred in the thriller film The Roommate as Rebecca Evans, an obsessive, bipolar woman. Though the film received mainly negative reviews, Meester's portrayal was praised. Entertainment Weekly found she was the only one to bring "the slightest trace of something fascinating to her role," while Los Angeles Times wrote, "[Meester's] performance often has the feeling of a sports car in neutral. When she punches it for quick changes of tone from manic to wounded or around the bend, she shows how much more she is capable of." In the teen comedy film Monte Carlo, Meester portrayed Meg Kelly, Selena Gomez's stepsister and Katie Cassidy's friend. Movieline noted, "As in Country Strong, Meester's crack timing and irresistible poignancy illuminate a part that would leave other actresses simpering themselves off the screen." Her final film of the year, The Oranges, opposite Hugh Laurie and Adam Brody, premiered at the Toronto International Film Festival. Meester's performance was again met with positive reviews, with the San Francisco Chronicle writing that she "succeeds in embodying all that is alluring and alarming about a 24-year-old woman."

In April 2012, Meester announced via Twitter a five-city tour with Check in the Dark, which started on May 29 and ended on June 4, 2012. Reflecting on her past pop collaborations, she said she "loved" them, but that folk music was "a lot closer to [her] heart." In May 2012, she endorsed the Philippine clothing brand Penshoppe's campaign All Stars. In June, Meester said she and the band had recorded all the songs for an album that served as a demo.

She next starred in the comedy film That's My Boy, alongside Adam Sandler, Andy Samberg, and Milo Ventimiglia, which was released in June 2012. The film received mainly negative reviews, was nominated for eight Golden Raspberry Awards, and was a box office failure, grossing less than $58 million, failing to recoup its production budget of $70 million. In August 2012, Meester, Wilmer Valderrama and Vanessa Curry appeared in house music group The Nomads' music video for "Addicted to Love". She was unavailable to reprise her role as Carrie Bishop in the film Veronica Mars due to scheduling issues, and was replaced by singer Andrea Estella of the band Twin Sister. In October 2013, Biotherm, a French luxury skincare company, announced Meester as its new global ambassador.

2014–present: Broadway debut and Heartstrings
In April 2014, her comedy film Life Partners premiered at the Tribeca Film Festival. It follows the friendship between a lesbian (Meester) and a straight woman (Gillian Jacobs) who begin a new relationship. Meester made her Broadway debut in the stage adaptation of John Steinbeck's novel Of Mice and Men, starring opposite James Franco and Chris O'Dowd. The production filmed and broadcast in cinemas for one night through National Theatre Live, the first Broadway production to be selected by the program. She then appeared opposite Robert Downey, Jr., Robert Duvall, and Vera Farmiga in the David Dobkin-directed comedy-drama film The Judge, which premiered at the Toronto International Film Festival and released in October 2014. Meester next appeared in Like Sunday, Like Rain directed by Frank Whaley, playing the girlfriend of Green Day's singer Billie Joe Armstrong, and By the Gun, alongside Ben Barnes. She won the Best Actress Award for Like Sunday, Like Rain at the 2014 Williamsburg Independent Film Festival. She was the face of French brand Naf Naf's autumn/winter 2014 collection.

On September 9, 2014, it was announced her debut album, Heartstrings, would be released independently through her own label, Hotly Wanting, on October 28. With its style compared to ethereal singer-songwriters such as Tori Amos and Joni Mitchell, the nine-song LP was written by Meester and produced by Jeff Trott. The music video for the eponymous title track "Heartstrings" was released on October 29.

In 2015, Meester embarked on a tour to support the album, which began on January 6 in Los Angeles, California and ended on March 2 in San Francisco, California. Later that year, she appeared in advertisements for the Malaysian fashion brand Jimmy Choo. Meester was one of the 100 celebrity narrators featured in the documentary Unity, which had a limited theatrical release. In March 2016, she was cast in Fox's comedy series Making History as Deborah Revere, a colonial woman from 1775 and the daughter of American artisan Paul Revere. The series was cancelled after one season of nine episodes. Meester had a guest role on The Last Man on Earth.

In January 2018, Meester joined the cast of Semper Fi, starring alongside Jai Courtney, Nat Wolff and Finn Wittrock, which was released in October 2019. Meester starred in ABC's Single Parents alongside Taran Killam, which premiered in September 2018 and was cancelled after two seasons. In 2019, Meester was a guest star in an episode of The Orville titled "Lasting Impressions" as Laura Huggins. In 2022, she appeared in a recurring role of Meredith in How I Met Your Father, starred in the thriller film The Weekend Away and voiced a role in the animated film My Father's Dragon.

Philanthropy 

Meester has participated in several charitable campaigns. In 2008, she was a spokesperson for Sunsilk's "Life Can't Wait" campaign, which aimed at motivating women to pursue their dreams. She also collaborated with Safe Horizon in 2009 to raise awareness about domestic violence. In 2015, Meester auctioned off fashion and accessories in a charity auction on eBay. The proceeds benefited Many Hopes, a charity organization that builds schools and homes for children in Kenya.

Meester has been volunteering with the non-profit organization Feeding America since 2017. During her first two years working with Feeding America, she has volunteered at Los Angeles' Downtown Women's Center and assisted with relief efforts in Puerto Rico after Hurricane Maria in 2017. Meester and Adam Brody also worked with children at Para Los Niños Charter School in Los Angeles, where they helped the organization serve lunches to children. In January 2019, she participated in Feeding America's campaign with Subway and Shamrock Farms. For every child's meal with milk purchased on January 11, 2019, at Subway, $1 will be donated to Feeding America to fight hunger and homelessness.

In May 2019, Meester worked together with Feeding America and Los Angeles Food Bank to help families in need. "Together, we helped fill grocery baskets for families who lined up to receive important staples, like fruit, rice and cereal," Meester wrote in an Instagram post.

In 2021, to encourage donations to help people with Congenital Central Hypoventilation Syndrome, Leighton Meester started promoting meetings on the Omaze network ("Win a Coffee Date with Leighton Meester").

Public image 
Meester has been included in magazine lists of the world's most beautiful women. Meester was named one of People magazine's "100 Most Beautiful" in 2008. She was ranked No. 48 on Maxim magazine's "Hot 100 of 2008" list and #12 on "Hot 100 of 2009" list. FHM magazine's ranked her #1 on their list of "Fall TV's Hottest Stars" in 2008. Meester has been included on The Independent Critics' list of "100 Most Beautiful Famous Faces". She ranked No. 21 in 2008, #14 in 2009, #4 in 2010, #36 in 2011, and #76 in 2012.

Meester has graced the cover of numerous international fashion magazines, including US' Lucky, Flaunt, Shape, Nylon, Allure, Teen Vogue, Harper's Bazaar and Rolling Stone; Indonesia's Elle, Marie Claire, Cosmopolitan and CosmoGirl; UK's Company and InStyle; Morocco's L'Officiel; Australia's Cleo; Mexico's GQ and Seventeen; Russia's Elle Girl and Joy and Italy's Glamour. She has appeared in commercials and print ads throughout her career. She has appeared in print ads for Missoni, Reebok, Herbal Essences, Vera Wang and Jimmy Choo. In 2013, she worked as a global brand ambassador for skin care company Biotherm. In 2022 she became the face for the luxury fashion retail platform 
Farfetch.

Meester is popular on social media and endorses products such as beauty and wellness products on Instagram. She has 6.2 million followers on Instagram, and 1.6 million followers on Twitter as of November 2020. She has partnered with several brands, including Shamrock Farms, Nexxus New York Salon and Sunglass Hut.

Personal life

Legal
In July 2011, Meester and her mother, Constance, filed lawsuits against each other over Meester's financial support of her younger brother, Alexander, who has multiple health problems. Meester's suit claimed that her mother used the money she sent for "cosmetic procedures", such as botox and hair extensions. Her mother's suit made a counterclaim alleging breach of contract and physical abuse. Constance claimed that a verbal contract was in place where Meester had promised US$10,000 a month, instead of the US$7,500 she received. Her mother also claimed that she was due a larger sum in return for "sacrificing her own happiness" when she moved Meester to Los Angeles as a child to pursue acting. 

In court, the judge dismissed this claim. Constance accused her daughter of calling social services and fabricating a claim that she was abusing Alexander; investigators interviewed Meester and found no merit in the complaint. In November 2011, Constance dropped the US$3 million claim for damages against her daughter. Meester said that she would be willing to pay for her brother's medical expenses as well as his school tuition, but denied that she agreed to pay US$10,000 each month, which she stated was a "ridiculous" claim. Meester obtained a default judgment on December 7, 2011. In June 2012, Meester won the lawsuit, with the judge rejecting the claims in her mother's counter-suit.

Residence and family
Meester resides in Los Angeles. In November 2013, she became engaged to actor Adam Brody, whom she met while filming The Oranges in March 2010. The couple were married in a private ceremony on February 15, 2014. Their first child, a daughter, was born on August 4, 2015. In April 2020, it was revealed that the couple were expecting their second child. In September 2020, Brody confirmed their second child, a son, was born.

Filmography

Film

Television

Stage

Discography

Tours
 Leighton Meester + Check in the Dark Summer Tour (2012)
 Heartstrings Tour (2015)

Awards and nominations

References

External links

 
 
 
 

1986 births
20th-century American actresses
21st-century American actresses
21st-century American singers
Actresses from Florida
Actresses from Texas
American child actresses
American child models
Female models from Texas
American women pop singers
American film actresses
American stage actresses
American television actresses
Beverly Hills High School alumni
Female models from Florida
Hollywood High School alumni
Living people
People from Marco Island, Florida
People from Fort Worth, Texas
Songwriters from Florida
Songwriters from Texas
21st-century American women singers
Vagrant Records artists